Malyn District (Raion) was a raion (district) of Zhytomyr Oblast, northern Ukraine. Its administrative centre was located at Malyn, which did not belong to the raion and was incorporated separately as a city of oblast significance. The raion was abolished on 18 July 2020 as part of the administrative reform of Ukraine, which reduced the number of raions of Zhytomyr Oblast to four. The area of Malyn Raion was merged into Korosten Raion. The last estimate of the raion population was

Geography 
It was situated in the north-eastern part of the Oblast. Distance Malyn to the Oblast center is a 102 km by highways.

Social and historic tourist objects 

There is the row of sights of architecture and town-planning: Mykolaivska church in v. Vorsivka (in 1850), St. Mykhailyvska church in v Ukrainka (end of a ХІХc.); railway station in v. Chopovychi (the end of the ХІХc.).

References

External links
 Find out Malyn District @ Ukrainian.Travel {en}

Former raions of Zhytomyr Oblast
1923 establishments in Ukraine
Ukrainian raions abolished during the 2020 administrative reform